The 1987 Southeast Missouri State Indians football team represented Southeast Missouri State University as a memberof the Missouri Intercollegiate Athletic Association (MIAA) during the 1987 NCAA Division II football season. Southeast Missouri State played home games at Houck Stadium in Cape Girardeau, Missouri.

Schedule

References

Southeast Missouri State
Southeast Missouri State Redhawks football seasons
Mid-America Intercollegiate Athletics Association football champion seasons
Southeast Missouri State Indians football